Kritika Pandey is an Indian writer, well known for her short story writing. She is the recipient of a 2021 residency grant at the Helene Wurlitzer Foundation. She is the overall winner of the Commonwealth Short Story Prize in 2020, having been shortlisted for the prize in 2018 as well as 2016.

Notable works 

 The Great Indian Tee and Snakes (Short Story) Granta
 Profound Earthly Suffering (Short Story) BBC Radio 4
 How Do I Talk to My Father About Constellations? (Personal Essay) The Kenyon Review
 The Goddess Who Wants Out (Short Story) The Bombay Literary Magazine
 Thirty-One Things About the Lime of Control (Personal Essay) The Common

References 

Indian writers
Indian women writers
1991 births
Living people